Liam Graham (born 16 March 1976) is a South African cricketer. He played in 4 first-class and 27 List A matches for Border from 2000 to 2004.

See also
 List of Border representative cricketers

References

External links
 

1976 births
Living people
South African cricketers
Border cricketers
Cricketers from Johannesburg